Sergei Belyak  (May 19, 1958) is a Russian lawyer, musician, photographer.

Biography
Sergei Belyak was born in Podolsk in 1958. He studied on Saratov State Academy of Law

Law practice
Belyak served as lawyer for Vladimir Zhirinovsky, Yury Shutov, Andrei Klimentev and others.

Belyak served as lawyer for Eduard Limonov. In 2003 court granted the early release of National Bolshevik Party leader In 2003, Limonov was released from Lefortovo Prison.

Personal life
Sergei Belyak is musician. He is also an author of photo album "Girls of the Party" and autobiography "The Devil's advocate".

References

External links
 Official blog of Sergei Belyak in LJ 
 Interview with Sergei Belyak on Radio Svoboda
 Interview with Sergei Belyak in Izvestia
 Interview with Sergei Belyak in Rolling Stone
 Article about Sergei Belyak in Izvestia

1958 births
Living people
21st-century Russian lawyers
20th-century Russian lawyers
Russian musicians
Russian photographers